The Embassy of the Hellenic Republic in Moscow is the chief diplomatic mission of Greece in the Russian Federation. It is located at 4 Leontevsky Lane in the Presnensky District of Moscow.

In the early 2010, the historical building that houses the Embassy underwent a thorough renovation, which was executed by the GlavUpDK.

See also
 Greece–Russia relations
 Diplomatic missions in Russia

References

Greece–Russia relations
Greece
Moscow
Cultural heritage monuments of federal significance in Moscow